This is a list of law enforcement agencies in the state of Connecticut.

According to the US Bureau of Justice Statistics' 2008 Census of State and Local Law Enforcement Agencies, the state had 143 law enforcement agencies employing 8,281 sworn police officers, about 236 for each 100,000 residents.

State agencies 
 Connecticut State Capitol Police
 Connecticut Department of Correction
 Connecticut Department of Motor Vehicles
 Commercial Vehicle Safety Division
 Connecticut Department of Energy and Environmental Protection
 Connecticut State Environmental Conservation Police
 Connecticut Department of Mental Health and Addiction Services 
 Public Safety Division
 Connecticut Judicial Branch
 Superior Court Operations Division
 Judicial Marshal Services
 Connecticut Department of Emergency Services and Public Protection
 Connecticut State Police
Connecticut State Division of Criminal Justice

Municipal agencies 

Ansonia Police Department
Avon Police Department
Beacon Falls Police Department
Berlin Police Department
Bethany Police Department*
Bethel Police Department
Bethlehem Police Department*
Bloomfield Police Department
Branford Police Department
Bridgeport Police Department
Bridgewater Police Department*
Bristol Police Department
Brookfield Police Department
Burlington Police Department*
Canton Police Department
Cheshire Police Department
Chester Police Department*
Clinton Police Department
Colchester Police Department*
Coventry Police Department
Cromwell Police Department
Danbury Police Department
Darien Police Department
Deep River Police Department*
Derby Police Department
East Granby Police Department*
East Haddam Police Department*
East Hampton Police Department
East Hartford Police Department
East Haven Police Department
East Lyme Police Department
East Windsor Police Department
Easton Police Department
Enfield Police Department
Ellington Police Department*
Essex Police Department*
Fairfield Police Department
Farmington Police Department
Glastonbury Police Department
Granby Police Department
Greenwich Police Department
Groton Police Department (City of Groton)
Groton Police Department (Town of Groton)
Groton Long Point Police Department
Guilford Police Department
Hamden Police Department
Hartford Police Department
Hebron Police Department*
Killingly Police Department*
Lebanon Police Department*
Ledyard Police Department
Litchfield Police Department*
Madison Police Department
Manchester Police Department
Marlborough Police Department
Meriden Police Department
Middlebury Police Department
Middletown Police Department
Milford Police Department
Monroe Police Department
Montville Police Department*
Naugatuck Police Department

New Britain Police Department
New Canaan Police Department
New Fairfield Police Department*
New Hartford Police Department*
New Haven Police Department
New London Police Department
New Milford Police Department
Newington Police Department
Newtown Police Department
North Branford Police Department
North Haven Police Department
Norwalk Police Department
Norwich Police Department
Old Lyme Police Department*
Old Saybrook Police Department
Orange Police Department
Oxford Police Department*
Plainfield Police Department
Plainville Police Department
Plymouth Police Department
Portland Police Department
Prospect Police Department*
Putnam Police Department
Redding Police Department
Ridgefield Police Department
Rocky Hill Police Department
Roxbury Police Department*
Seymour Police Department
Shelton Police Department
Simsbury Police Department
Somers Police Department*
South Windsor Police Department
Southbury Police Department*
Southington Police Department
Stafford Police Department*
Stamford Police Department
Stonington Police Department
Stratford Police Department
Suffield Police Department
Thomaston Police Department
Torrington Police Department
Trumbull Police Department
 Vernon Police Department
Washington Police Department*
Wallingford Police Department
Waterbury Police Department
Waterford Police Department
Watertown Police Department
West Hartford Police Department
West Haven Police Department
Westbrook Police Department*
Weston Police Department
Westport Police Department
Wethersfield Police Department
Willimantic Police Department
Wilton Police Department
Winchester Police Department
Windsor Police Department
Windsor Locks Police Department
Wolcott Police Department
Woodbridge Police Department
Woodbury Police Department*

Departments marked by a "*" are in towns that participate in the Connecticut State Police's Resident Trooper Program. The town's police officers are overseen by the town's Resident State Trooper(s).

College and University agencies 

Central Connecticut State University Police Department
Eastern Connecticut State University Department of Public Safety
Manchester Community College Police Department
Southern Connecticut State University Police Department

University of Connecticut Police Department
University of New Haven Police Department
Western Connecticut State University Police Department
Yale Police Department

Other agencies 
Aquarion Water Company Police
Candlewood Lake Authority Marine Patrol
 Connecticut State Marshal 
South Central Connecticut Regional Water Authority Police Department
Lake Housatonic Lake Authority Marine Patrol
Lake Lillinonah Authority Law Enforcement Division
Lake Zoar Authority Marine Patrol
Metropolitan District Commission of Connecticut
Rogers Lake Authority Marine Patrol

Tribal police agencies  
Mashantucket Pequot Police Department
Mohegan Tribal Police Department

References

Connecticut
Law enforcement agencies